The 2007 North American Under 21 World Qualifier motorcycle speedway competition took place on 24 August in Auburn, California. The champion was Ricky Wells.

2007
North American Under 21 World Qualifier, 2007
North American Under 21 World Qualifier
Speed